Mordellistena comes is a beetle in the genus Mordellistena of the family Mordellidae. It was described in 1876 by Mars.

References

comes
Beetles described in 1876